Galaxy of 2PM is the fifth Japanese studio album by South Korean boy band 2PM. It was released on April 27, 2016 in five editions:

 Regular edition: CD
 Limited edition A: CD + DVD
 Limited edition B (Jun. K x Taecyeon edition): CD + bonus tracks
 Limited edition C (Nichkhun x Wooyoung Edition): CD + bonus tracks
 Limited edition D (Junho x Chansung edition): CD + bonus tracks

There are 12 new tracks in the regular edition and limited edition albums, including tracks from 2PM's previous single, "Higher".

The album debuted at number one on the Weekly Oricon Albums Chart.

On June 15, 2016 2PM released two repackaged editions of Galaxy of 2PM:

 Regular edition: CD + new song "Milky Way ~Galaxy~"
 Limited edition: CD + DVD

Track listing

Galaxy of 2PM (repackaged edition) DVD track list (limited edition)

Release history

Charts

Oricon

Other charts

Certification

References

External links
 Japanese Official Website

2016 albums
2PM albums
Japanese-language albums
Epic Records albums
Sony Music Entertainment Japan albums
J-pop albums